The 1909 New Zealand Māori rugby league tour of Australia was a tour made by a group of New Zealand Māori rugby footballers who played rugby league matches in Queensland and New South Wales. The tour followed on from another Māori tour of Australia the previous year and a tour by the New Zealand national side a month earlier. The Māori side played the Australian national side four times, winning one of the "test" matches.

The tour

Following the first "test", won by the Māori 16-14, about 5,000 of the 30,000 crowd invaded the pitch, upset with the standard of refereeing. Only about a dozen police were present and it took them almost an hour to assist the referee from the ground.

Before the fourth "test" nine players from the tour were detained, after Robert Jack claimed he was owed money relating to the 1908 tour. The NSWRL paid Jack his claimed debt, rather than risk the match being called off.

The team were awarded the O T Punch Cup for their victories over Sydney teams. The cup had been damaged when the crowd invaded the pitch in the first "test".

Aftermath
The 1909 side was the first to wear a kiwi emblem on their uniforms. The New Zealand national side is now called the Kiwis.

Squad
Only 19 players were involved in the squad, with a maximum of 18 available for selection at any one time. Seventeen travelled with the main party, however Nirai Chareure broke his collarbone after the first match. Tohe Herangi joined the touring party after the first match and Hone Tuki arrived in time for the first 'test' match.

Mākereti (Maggie) and Murai (Bella) Papakura and two Māori chiefs travelled with the side. NSW selector Denis Lutge was assigned to the team as an advisor.

Match results
Before the side left New Zealand they lost 14-21 to Auckland on 10 July 1909 at Victoria Park in front of 2-3,000 spectators.

References

New Zealand Māori rugby league team
Rugby league tours of Australia
Maori rugby league tour of Australia
Maori rugby league tour of Australia